Ancyra is a small genus of planthoppers of the family Eurybrachidae and the only genus in the tribe Ancyrini. Species in this genus occur in southeast Asia.

Description
Members of the genus are well known for having a pair of prolonged filaments at the tips of the forewings that arise near a pair of small glossy spots; this creates the impression of a pair of antennae, with corresponding "eyes" (a remarkable case of automimicry). The "false head" effect is further reinforced by the bugs' habit of walking backwards when it detects movement nearby, so as to misdirect predators to strike at its rear, rather than at its actual head.

Taxonomy
The genus Ancyra was first named in 1845 by Scottish zoologist Adam White. It is the only genus of the tribe Ancyrini (subfamily Platybrachinae, family Eurybrachidae). The type species is Ancyra appendiculata, the species name meaning bearing appendages.

Species
, lists the following seven species in the genus Ancyra:

Ancyra annamensis  – Vietnam
Ancyra appendiculata  – Myanmar
Ancyra histrionica  – Cambodia, Myanmar
Ancyra luangana 
Ancyra nigrifrons  – Malaysia
Ancyra vicina  – Vietnam
Ancyra xiengana

References

Eurybrachidae
Auchenorrhyncha genera